The Coverage of an Information system is a criterion for the completeness of the records in the information system.
It is defined as the ratio of the number of instances/records in the system (mostly implemented as a Database) that represent real world entities  and the number of entities that exist (in the real world) and should be represented in the information system according to its purpose.

Example: If there are 170 countries in the world and an information system holds 153 country records then the coverage of countries of this information system is 90%.

Bibliography 
 https://www.phil-fak.uni-duesseldorf.de/fileadmin/Redaktion/Institute/Informationswissenschaft/stock/271.pdf
 
 

Information systems
Information